The End of History is the debut studio album by the Irish folk musician Fionn Regan, released on 7 August 2006 on Bella Union. The album was nominated for the 2007 Mercury Prize, and was also named Best Irish Album of 2006 by the Irish Independent.

Track listing

Personnel
All personnel credits adapted from the album's liner notes.

Performer
Fionn Regan – vocals, guitar, backing vocals, piano (5), banjo (6), saw (7), tambourine (10), producer, mixing, design, photography

Additional musicians
Jamie Morrison – drums (3, 5, 7), vibrations (2)
Louis Vause – piano (12)
Laura Murphy – backing vocals (5)
Anna Phoebe – violin (8, 9)
Oli – cello, violin (2)

Technical personnel
Karl Odlum – bass (7, 10), engineer (1, 3, 4, 7, 10, 11, 13)
Mike Pellanconi – engineer (3, 5, 7–9, 12)
Mark Bishop – engineer (2)
Liam Mulvaney – engineer (5)
Simon Raymonde – mixing
Finn Eiles – mixing engineer
Denis Blackham – mastering

Chart positions

References

2006 debut albums
Fionn Regan albums
Bella Union albums
Lost Highway Records albums